Joseph Anthony Lis (August 15, 1946 – October 17, 2010), was an American professional baseball first baseman, who played in Major League Baseball (MLB) for the Philadelphia Phillies (–), Minnesota Twins (–), Cleveland Indians (–), and Seattle Mariners. During his playing days, Lis stood 6 feet (1.83 m) tall, weighing ; he batted and threw right-handed.

Born in Somerville, New Jersey and raised in nearby Manville, he moved with his family to Hillsborough Township as a pre-teen and attended Somerville High School, where he played both basketball and baseball.

Signed as an undrafted free agent in 1964 by the Philadelphia Phillies out of high school, when he was 17. 

Lis entered the majors in 1970 with the Philadelphia Phillies, playing for them three years before joining the Minnesota Twins (1973–1974), Cleveland Indians (1974–1976), and Seattle Mariners (1977). He had been traded along with Ken Sanders and Ken Reynolds by the Phillies to the Twins for César Tovar on December 1, 1972. While relegated to playing mainly first base as a big leaguer, he also played left field, right field, third base, and even caught in one game.

A good power hitter in Minor League Baseball (MiLB), Lis swatted at least 33 home runs in three separate MiLB seasons. He batted .306 with 30 homers and an International League-leading 103 runs batted in (RBI) with the Toledo Mud Hens and shared Most Valuable Player (MVP) honors with Rich Dauer and Mickey Klutts in 1976. Nevertheless, Lis never translated his minor league success into a full-time job in the major leagues. His most productive MLB season was 1973, with Minnesota, when he posted career-high numbers in homers (nine), runs batted in (RBI) (25), and games played (103), as a replacement for injured Harmon Killebrew.

Lis also played in Nippon Professional Baseball, for the Kintetsu Buffaloes, in 1978. He finished his baseball career with the Triple-A Champion, Evansville Triplets, in the  season.

Following his playing career, Lis coached youth baseball for over 30 years, including in the Newburgh American Legion from 1984 to 2002. In 2003, he became General Manager of the Evansville Wolfepack 18-year-old travel team. Lis also owned and operated the Joe Lis Baseball School since 1991, and worked at James R. Pyle Insurance Agency since 1989.

Lis died from prostate cancer in Evansville, Indiana, at the age of 64, on October 17, 2010.

References

External links

Joe Lis at SABR (Baseball BioProject)
Joe Lis at Baseball Gauge
Lis at Pura Pelota (Venezuelan Professional Baseball League)
Joe Lis at The Deadball Era

1946 births
2010 deaths
American expatriate baseball players in Japan
Bakersfield Bears players
Baseball players from New Jersey
Cleveland Indians players
Deaths from cancer in Indiana
Deaths from prostate cancer
Eugene Emeralds players
Evansville Triplets players
Florida Instructional League Phillies players
Iowa Oaks players
Kintetsu Buffaloes players
Leones del Caracas players
American expatriate baseball players in Venezuela
Major League Baseball first basemen
Miami Marlins (FSL) players
Minnesota Twins players
Oklahoma City 89ers players
People from Hillsborough Township, New Jersey
People from Manville, New Jersey
Somerville High School (New Jersey) alumni
Sportspeople from Somerville, New Jersey
Philadelphia Phillies players
Seattle Mariners players
Tidewater Tides players
Toledo Mud Hens players
International League MVP award winners
Burials in Indiana